Hachi may refer to:
 Hachi, overlapping plates in a kabuto helmet
 Hachi: A Dog's Tale, a 2009 drama film

People 
 , member of the visual kei band Dolly
 , Vocaloid stage name of Kenshi Yonezu (born 1991)
 Waberi Hachi (born 1981), Djiboutian soccer player
 Hachi Hülüg, member of the Genghis Khan family tree

Fictional characters 
Hachi is a common nickname in Japanese.

Hachi, the nickname for Hachigen Ushōda, a character in the manga Bleach (manga)
Hachi, a dog in the manga Fighting Spirit
Hachi, the nickname of Nana Komatsu, one of the main characters from the manga Nana
Hachi, the nickname of Hatchan, a character from the manga One Piece
Hachi, a nickname of Hachirota "Hachimaki" Hoshino, the main character of the manga Planetes
Hachi, the pet dog of the Isasaka family in the comic strip Sazae-san
Hachi, name of a cat in The Travelling Cat Chronicles by Hiro Arikawa

Places 
 Hachi Darreh, a village in northwestern Iran

See also 
Ellychnia hatchi
Hachikō, a Japanese Akita dog, subject of Hachi: A Dog's Tale
Harpalus hatchi
Honeybee Hutch, named Hatchi in the original Japanese version
Kevin Hatchi (born 1981), French footballer